The  Portland Thunder season was the inaugural season for the franchise in the Arena Football League. The team was coached by Matthew Sauk and played its home games at the Moda Center. With a 5–13 record in the regular season, the Thunder qualified for the playoffs. However, they were defeated in the conference semifinals by the Arizona Rattlers by a 52–48 score.

Standings

Schedule

Regular season
The Thunder's inaugural game took place on March 17, at home against the San Jose SaberCats. The team hosted the Spokane Shock in its last regular season game on July 26.

Playoffs

Roster

References

Portland Thunder
2014 in Portland, Oregon
Portland Thunder seasons
Portland Thunder